Pleasant Valley School in Bellvue, Colorado is a rural one-room schoolhouse that was built in 1879.  Its foundation and walls were built of sandstone from a nearby quarry.  It has a front-gabled simple roof with wide overhanging eaves.

It was converted for use as a residence for farm staff in the 1930s and 1940s, with addition of electricity, plumbing, and a new hardwood floor.  The school's belfry and bell, which were at the south end of the roof, were donated to, and are located at, Bellvue's Church of Christ.

The building was listed on the National Register of Historic Places in 2003.

It was deemed significant "for its association with the educational history of Larimer County between the years 1879-1913, being directly influenced by the national and state educational trend of consolidation."  Consolidation of students from smaller rural schools was needed to improve quality of education.  It was also important "for its architectural significance as a
rare example of a stone schoolhouse in the county, while exhibiting the distinguishing characteristics of rural one-room schoolhouses."

See also
National Register of Historic Places listings in Larimer County, Colorado

References

School buildings completed in 1879
One-room schoolhouses in Colorado
Buildings and structures in Larimer County, Colorado
School buildings on the National Register of Historic Places in Colorado
National Register of Historic Places in Larimer County, Colorado